Barbara Hall may refer to:

 Barbara Hall (1919–2014), pen name of cartoonist Barbara Fiske Calhoun
Barbara Hall (editor) (1923–2022), British crossword puzzles editor for the Sunday Times
Barbara Feldon (born Barbara Hall, 1933), American actress
Barbara Hall (politician) (born 1946), Canadian lawyer, public servant and former politician
Barbara Hall (artist), Australian artist involved with the Women's Art Movement in Sydney in the 1970s–80s
Barbara Hall (TV producer) (born 1961), American writer and producer of television series

See also
 Barbara Partee (Barbara Hall Partee, born 1940), professor of linguistics